Argiles et Grès à Reptiles Formation (meaning Reptile Clay and Sandstone) also known as the Argiles Rutilantes Formation is an early Maastrichtian French geologic formation in the département of Var preserving the remains of several types of dinosaurs and other extinct organisms.

Fossil content 
An abelisaurid similar to Arcovenator is known from Département des Bouches-du-Rhone, while enantiornithean and indeterminate avialan remains are known from Département du Var.

Dinosaurs

Crocodylians 
 Acynodon iberoccitanus
 Allodaposuchus sp.
 Alligatoridae indet.
 Crocodylidae indet.

Turtles 
 Foxemys mechinorum
 cf. Polysternon sp.
 cf. Solemys sp.

Pterosaurs 
 Mistralazhdarcho maggii

Fish 
 Hybodontiformes indet.
 Lepisosteidae indet.

Fossil eggs 
 Megaloolithus aureliensis
 Megaloolithus petralta
 Megaloolithus sp.

Flora 
 Peckichara cancellata
 P. pectinata
 Platychara caudata
 Saportanella maslovi
 ?Amblyochara begudiana

See also 
 List of dinosaur-bearing stratigraphic units
 List of fossiliferous stratigraphic units in France

References

Bibliography

Further reading 

 R. Cousin, G. Breton, R. Fournier and J.-P. Watte. 1994. Dinosaur egglaying and nesting in France. K. Carpenter, K.F. Hirsch & J.R. Horner (eds.) Dinosaur Eggs and Babies. Cambridge University Press, Cambridge 56-74
 J. Le Loeuff, E. Buffetaut, P. Méchin and A. Méchin-Salessy. 1992. The first record of dromaeosaurid dinosaurs (Saurischia, Theropoda) in the Maastrichtian of southern Europe: palaeobiogeographical implications. Bulletin de la Société géologique de la France 163(3):337-343
 R. Dughi and F. Sirugue. 1958. Sur les oeufs de dinosaures du bassin fluvio-lacustre de Basse-Provence. Comptes Rendus du Congrès National des Sociétés Savantes, Section des Sciences, Paris 83:183-20

Geologic formations of France
Upper Cretaceous Series of Europe
Cretaceous France
Maastrichtian Stage
Sandstone formations
Shale formations
Fluvial deposits
Ooliferous formations
Fossiliferous stratigraphic units of Europe
Paleontology in France